Mandy Stadtmiller (born October 24, 1975) is an author and columnist for New York magazine, former editor-at-large of xoJane, "Girl Talk" columnist for Penthouse and host of the comedy podcast "News Whore." She is also known for her dating column in the New York Post, called "About Last Night." Her other Post-published exploits include a visit to Nevada's first male prostitute and a controversial "Cheat Sheet".

Her TV appearances include Inside Amy Schumer, Nightline, 20/20, The Insider, Dr. Drew On Call, Jane Velez-Mitchell, Uncommon Sense with Charlamagne Tha God, Good Day New York, Red Eye, Katie, The Artie Lange Show, The Joy Behar Show, Howard Stern TV, Fuse TV and VH1.

She has also written for The Washington Post, The Los Angeles Times, Mashable, Maxim, Time Out, The Village Voice, The Fort Lauderdale Sun-Sentinel, The Des Moines Register, Playgirl and Match.com.

She is a contributor to HuffPost Live.

Stadtmiller wrote about inspiring the Nina Howard character (played by Hope Davis) in The Newsroom after briefly dating Aaron Sorkin and showed their correspondence about the development of the "Bad Mandy" character in xoJane.

Early life
Stadtmiller was born in San Diego in 1975 to Patricia and Jerry Stadtmiller, a Marine and Vietnam veteran. In a 2018 interview, Stadtmiller stated that multiple bullet wounds to the face received during combat in Vietnam left her father completely blind and suffering anger management issues related to an acquired brain injury.

She attended The University of San Diego High School in California. In 1997, she received a bachelor's degree in journalism from Northwestern University.

Career
In August 2006, Stadtmiller was groped and bitten by actor/comedian Andy Dick during an interview following his appearance on the Comedy Central Roast of William Shatner. She wrote about the incident for Page Six of The New York Post. Dick claimed that Stadtmiller "slanted" the incident.

In 2006, Stadtmiller won first place in New York's Funniest Reporter Show contest in the New York City Underground Comedy Festival. In October 2007, she became a semi-finalist in the search for New York's Funniest Stand-Up a contest run by the New York Comedy Festival. She performs stand-up comedy throughout New York City at various clubs and venues.

In 2010, she went undercover as a client to hire the nation's first legal male prostitute, who worked at the Shady Lady Ranch. The article received notable attention from such media outlets as The Colbert Report and The Joy Behar Show.

According to her Twitter account, in February 2012 Stadtmiller quit the New York Post. She is a frequent contributor to the gossip pages of Page Six.

Stadtmiller was Editor-at-Large of Jane Pratt's site xoJane. In September 2015, she wrote about continuing to have this role at the site but going freelance in a controversial piece called "How I Became a First-Person Human Trafficker" for New York. For her work at xoJane, Stadtmiller was profiled twice in The New York Observer, as well as on Flavorwire and The Rumpus.

In 2014, she was named as one of the 25 "most shameless people on the Web" at SXSW, where she was featured on a panel with Jane Pratt, Kristina Wong and Issa Rae for "Fearlessly Funny: The Women Changing Digital Humor."

Largely known for her social media presence, Stadtmiller was the first verified Twitter user from the New York Post, and frequently writes about using social media for networking, including how to boost one's Klout score.

Stadtmiller currently hosts a podcast on the RiotCast Network called News Whore. News Whore debuted at #22 in comedy podcasts on iTunes and has consistently remained in the top 100 since its launch in July.

In early 2015, Stadtmiller announced "The Mandy Project," a month-long quest to find the perfect Valentine's Day date in partnership with the online dating website Plenty of Fish. For a month, she chronicled going on a series of dates and testing out romantic cliches such as "Play hard to get," "Love like you've never been hurt" and "Everything happens for a reason." The next month she announced that she would be documenting her relationship in "real-time" in a Kindle singles series called "Dear TMI-ary",  where she wrote about her new relationship with Pat Dixon. On 11 November 2015, she and Dixon married onstage in a comedy club, as part of Dixon's comedy show. Both the proposal and the wedding were broadcast on social media app Periscope, and tickets could be purchased to attend the joint wedding/comedy show.

In 2016, she began the weekly "Unwifeable" column for New York magazine's The Cut, chronicling her unlikely and unfolding marriage to Pat Dixon despite being, in her eyes, "the most unwifeable woman in New York".

Stadtmiller writes a Substack called "Rabbitholed," which she describes as "The craziest stories in the world you never knew with the analysis you need now."

List of News Whore episodes

Television appearances 
 Good Day New York (2006)
 Red Eye (2007)
 Fuse TV's "10 Great Reasons" (2007)
 VH1’s "Rock Band Cometh" (2007)
The Insider (2010)
The Joy Behar Show (2010)
Pepsi: The Flow (2011)
20/20 (2012)
Dr. Drew On Call (2012)
Media Mayhem with Allison Hope Weiner (2013)
Jane Velez-Mitchell (2013)
The Artie Lange Show (2014)
Katie (2014)
Inside Amy Schumer (2014)
Nightline (2014)
Last Week Tonight with John Oliver (2014)
CNN Daily Share (2015)

Radio show appearances 
 Howard Stern’s In Demand Channel (2006)
 The Lazlow Show (2006)
 Raw Dog Comedy (2007)
 Opie and Anthony (2007, 2013, 2014)
 Maxim Radio (2007)
 WOR (2007)
 The Jenny Hutt Show (2012, 2015)
 The Jane Pratt Show (2012)
 The Alan Colmes Show (2014, 2015)
 My Wife Hates Me (2015)
 The Jenny McCarthy Show (2015)
 Emily McCombs "OverShare" (2015)
 My Wife Hates Me (2016)

Notes

External links
 "Unwifeable" column
 
 
 News Whore podcast

1975 births
21st-century American comedians
American women non-fiction writers
American women columnists
Northwestern University alumni
Living people
21st-century American women writers
21st-century American journalists
21st-century American non-fiction writers
Writers from San Diego
Journalists from California
Comedians from California
American women comedians